Attica is an historical region of Greece.

Attica may also refer to:

Attica (region), a modern administrative region of Greece
Attica Prefecture, a former prefecture of Central Greece
Attica Province, a former province of Greece
Attica (constituency), a former electoral district of Greece

Other places

United States 
Attica, Georgia
Attica, Indiana
Attica, Iowa
Attica, Kansas
 Attica, Michigan
Attica Township, Michigan
Attica (town), New York
Attica (village), New York
Attica, Ohio
Attica, Wisconsin

Elsewhere 
Attica, Saskatchewan, Canada

Attica prison uprising 
Attica Correctional Facility, a maximum security prison in Upstate New York
Attica Prison uprising of 1971
Attica (1980 film), a television film
Attica (2021 film), a documentary film

Other uses 
Attica!, a 2014 album by Wussy
Attica (automobiles), a Greek manufacturer of microcars
Attica (novel), a novel by the British writer Garry Kilworth
Attica (restaurant), a restaurant owned and operated by chef Ben Shewry
1138 Attica, an asteroid